Colledge is a surname. Notable people with the surname include:

 Brant Colledge (born 1994), Australian footballer
 Cecilia Colledge (1920–2008), British figure skater
 Daryn Colledge (born 1982), American football player
 J. J. Colledge (1908–1997), British naval historian
 Malcolm Colledge (1939-2015), British archaeologist, expert in the art of Palmyra
 Richard Colledge, Australian philosopher
 Thomas Richardson Colledge (1796–1879), Scottish surgeon and missionary

See also
 College (disambiguation)